Caepio may refer to:

Quintus Servilius Caepio (adoptive father of Brutus)
Quintus Servilius Caepio (consul 140 BC)
Quintus Servilius Caepio (consul 106 BC)
Quintus Servilius Caepio (quaestor 103 BC)
Fannius Caepio, executed in 22 BC for conspiring against Augustus
Caepio Crispinus, accused Granius Marcellus of extortion in 15 AD